Ashley C. Bradley is an American television writer and producer. She is known for her work on the animated series Trollhunters: Tales of Arcadia, 3Below: Tales of Arcadia, and What If...?.

Career 
In August 2019, it was announced Bradley would be the head writer and executive producer of the Marvel Studios animated series What If...?, which was released on Disney+ on August 11, 2021. She also serves as consulting producer and writer on Ms. Marvel.

Bradley’s first feature film, Much Ado, which is based on the William Shakespeare play Much Ado About Nothing, is currently in active development at Sony Pictures. Nisha Ganatra is attached to direct and Will Gluck is producing.

Personal life 
Bradley is from the borough of the Bronx in New York City. She studied international relations and English literature at Boston College and graduated from the USC School of Cinematic Arts with a master's degree and a M.F.A. degree in screenwriting.

Filmography

Awards and nominations

References

External links 
 

21st-century American screenwriters
Daytime Emmy Award winners
Living people
Writers from the Bronx
Place of birth missing (living people)
USC School of Cinematic Arts alumni
American women television writers
American women screenwriters
Year of birth missing (living people)
Morrissey College of Arts & Sciences alumni